List of Prime Suspect episodes may refer to:
 List of Prime Suspect (British TV series) episodes, episodes from the original United Kingdom version of Prime Suspect.
 Prime Suspect (American TV series)#Episodes, episodes from the adapted United States version of Prime Suspect.